Adriana Hernández (born 16 January 2003) is a Mexican rhythmic gymnast.

Hernández competed at the 2019 Pan American Games where she won gold medals in the group all-around and 5 balls events and a silver medal in the 3 hoops + 2 clubs event.

References

2003 births
Living people
Sportspeople from Tamaulipas
Mexican rhythmic gymnasts
Pan American Games medalists in gymnastics
Pan American Games gold medalists for Mexico
Pan American Games silver medalists for Mexico
Gymnasts at the 2019 Pan American Games
Medalists at the 2019 Pan American Games
21st-century Mexican women